Bury Castle is an Iron Age hillfort near Selworthy, Somerset, England. It has been designated as a scheduled monument.

History

Bury Castle was built on a spur of land overlooking the surrounding terrain. The main enclosure has a single rampart and ditch, with steep drops on the north, east and south sides. There is an additional rampart  to the west, with a deep ditch. The rampart is revetted with drystone walling.

Today
Bury Castle is today protected as a Scheduled Monument and owned by the National Trust. It has been added to the Heritage at Risk Register due to vulnerability from scrub or tree growth.

See also
 Castles in Great Britain and Ireland
 List of castles in England
 List of hillforts and ancient settlements in Somerset
 Hillforts in Britain
 Hillfort

References

Further reading
 Adkins l and R, 1992. A Field Guide to Somerset Archaeology.
 Burrow E J, 1924.  Ancient Earthworks and Camps of Somerset.
 Burrow I, 1981. Hillforts and Hilltop Settlements of Somerset.

Castles in Somerset
Hill forts in Somerset
Scheduled monuments in West Somerset
Structures on the Heritage at Risk register in Somerset